The 1980 TAA Formula Ford Driver to Europe Series was an Australian motor racing competition for Formula Ford racing cars. The series, which was the eleventh Australian Formula Ford Series, was won by Stephen Brook driving a Lola T440.

Series schedule

The series was contested over eight rounds with one race per round.

Points system
Points were awarded on a 20, 15, 12, 10, 8, 6, 4, 3, 2, 1 basis for the first ten places at each round.

Series standings 

Note: All cars were powered by mandatory 1600cc Ford four cylinder engines.

References

TAA Formula Ford Driver to Europe Series
Australian Formula Ford Series